Jackson Township is one of twelve townships in Harrison County, Indiana. As of the 2010 census, its population was 6,042 and it contained 2,417 housing units.

Geography

References

External links
 Indiana Township Association
 United Township Association of Indiana

Townships in Harrison County, Indiana
Townships in Indiana